KCJV-LP is an Oldies formatted broadcast radio station licensed to Leon Springs, Texas, serving San Antonio, Texas.  KCJV-LP is owned and operated by Hispanic Heritage Radio Network.

References

External links
 

2016 establishments in Texas
Oldies radio stations in the United States
Radio stations established in 2016
CJV-LP
CJV-LP